The PDGA World Championship is one of several major championships in the sport of disc golf, along with the United States Disc Golf Championship. Held annually since 1982, the event crowns world champions in several divisions in the professional disc golf fields. Since 1983, male and female competitors have played at the same venue every year.

There have been 18 different Champions in the Men's event with an average field of 155 competitors, and 17 different Champions in the Women's event with an average field of 26.  The event has been held in 19 US states as well as 1987 Toronto, Ontario, Canada.

Starting in 2017 the Open Men's and Women's divisions began playing in one tournament, while the age-based divisions will play in a separate World Championships. Thus allowing the potential to be the world champion in both Open and an age-based division. In 2017, the "Final 9" round was eliminated from the Championship format. This was a card of the top 4 competitors, occasionally more, playing a 9-hole final round without any other competitors in the field.

The 2020 PDGA World Championships were cancelled on June 1, 2020, due to the COVID-19 pandemic. This included the PDGA Professional Disc Golf World Championships in Odgen, Utah, the PDGA Junior Disc Golf World Championships in Emporia, Kansas, the PDGA Amateur Disc Golf Championships in Orlando, Florida, and the PDGA Professional Master Disc Golf Championships in Johnson City, Tennessee. "All four events will run in the same host cities in 2021, with previously awarded 2021 World Championship bids moving back to 2022," announced the PDGA, citing international travel concerns, the inability to allow spectators, the member experience, and the difficulty of postponing the events as reasons for this decision. "Rescheduling events now, with only two to three months of lead time to make these new arrangements and execute required contracts, puts a considerable strain on our partners. Pushing these decisions out by an additional month or more, with no clear end dates on international travel restrictions, will further hinder our hosts' abilities to successfully run these events."

Mixed Open World Champions

Women's Open World Champions

Men's Masters/Masters 40+ World Champions

Women's Masters/Masters 40+ World Champions

Men's Grandmasters/Masters 50+ World Champions

Women's Grandmasters/Masters 50+ World Champions

Men's Masters 55+ World Champions

Women's Masters 55+ World Champions

Men's Senior Grandmasters/Masters 60+ World Champions

Women's Senior Grandmasters/Masters 60+ World Champions

Men's Masters 65+ World Champions

Women's Masters 65+ World Champions

Men's Legend/Masters 70+ World Champions

Men's Masters 75+ World Champions

Men's Senior Legend/Masters 80+ World Champions

Men's Grand Legend/Masters 90+ World Champions

References

Disc golf tournaments